

Events

Pre-1600
 474 – Zeno is crowned as co-emperor of the Byzantine Empire.
1003 – Boleslaus III is restored to authority with armed support from Bolesław I the Brave of Poland.
1098 – The army of the First Crusade under the leadership of Bohemond of Taranto wins a battle against Seljuq emir Ridwan of Aleppo during the siege of Antioch
1539 – The first recorded race is held on Chester Racecourse, known as the Roodee.
1555 – Bishop of Gloucester John Hooper is burned at the stake.

1601–1900
1621 – Gregory XV becomes Pope, the last Pope elected by acclamation.
1654 – The Capture of Fort Rocher takes place during the Anglo-Spanish War.
1775 – American Revolutionary War: The British Parliament declares Massachusetts in rebellion.
1778 – Rhode Island becomes the fourth US state to ratify the Articles of Confederation.
1788 – The Habsburg Empire joins the Russo-Turkish War in the Russian camp.
1822 – Haiti attacks the newly established Dominican Republic on the other side of the island of Hispaniola.
1825 – After no candidate receives a majority of electoral votes in the US presidential election of 1824, the United States House of Representatives elects John Quincy Adams as sixth President of the United States in a contingent election.
1849 – The new Roman Republic is declared.
1861 – American Civil War: Jefferson Davis is elected the Provisional President of the Confederate States of America by the Provisional Confederate Congress at Montgomery, Alabama
1870 – US president Ulysses S. Grant signs a joint resolution of Congress establishing the U.S. Weather Bureau.
1889 – US president Grover Cleveland signs a bill elevating the United States Department of Agriculture to a Cabinet-level agency.
1893 – Verdi's last opera, Falstaff premieres at La Scala, Milan.
1895 – William G. Morgan creates a game called Mintonette, which soon comes to be referred to as volleyball.
1900 – The Davis Cup competition is established.

1901–present
1904 – Russo-Japanese War: Battle of Port Arthur concludes.
1907 – The Mud March is the first large procession organised by the National Union of Women's Suffrage Societies (NUWSS).
1913 – A group of meteors is visible across much of the eastern seaboard of the Americas, leading astronomers to conclude the source had been a small, short-lived natural satellite of the Earth.
1920 – Under the terms of the Svalbard Treaty, international diplomacy recognizes Norwegian sovereignty over Arctic archipelago Svalbard, and designates it as demilitarized.
1922 – Brazil becomes a member of the Berne Convention copyright treaty.
1929 – Members of the Việt Nam Quốc Dân Đảng assassinate the labor recruiter Bazin, prompting a crackdown by French colonial authorities.
1932 – Prohibition law is abolished in Finland after a national referendum, where 70% voted for a repeal of the law.
1934 – The Balkan Entente is formed between Greece, Romania, Yugoslavia, and Turkey.
1941 – World War II: Bombing of Genoa: The Cathedral of San Lorenzo in Genoa, Italy, is struck by a bomb which fails to detonate.
1942 – Year-round Daylight saving time (aka War Time) is reinstated in the United States as a wartime measure to help conserve energy resources.
1943 – World War II: Pacific War: Allied authorities declare Guadalcanal secure after Imperial Japan evacuates its remaining forces from the island, ending the Battle of Guadalcanal.
1945 – World War II: Battle of the Atlantic:  sinks U-864 off the coast of Fedje, Norway, in a rare instance of submarine-to-submarine combat.
  1945   – World War II: A force of Allied aircraft unsuccessfully attack a German destroyer in Førdefjorden, Norway.
1950 – Second Red Scare: US Senator Joseph McCarthy accuses the United States Department of State of being filled with Communists.
1951 – Korean War: The two-day Geochang massacre begins as a battalion of the 11th Division of the South Korean Army kills 719 unarmed citizens in Geochang, in the South Gyeongsang district of South Korea.
1959 – The R-7 Semyorka, the first intercontinental ballistic missile, becomes operational at Plesetsk, USSR.
1964 – The Beatles make their first appearance on The Ed Sullivan Show, performing before a record-setting audience of 73 million viewers across the United States.
1965 – Vietnam War: The United States Marine Corps sends a MIM-23 Hawk missile battalion to South Vietnam, the first American troops in-country without an official advisory or training mission.
1971 – The 6.5–6.7  Sylmar earthquake hits the Greater Los Angeles Area with a maximum Mercalli intensity of XI (Extreme), killing 64 and injuring 2,000.
  1971   – Satchel Paige becomes the first Negro league player to be voted into the USA's Baseball Hall of Fame.
  1971   – Apollo program: Apollo 14 returns to Earth after the third manned Moon landing.
1975 – The Soyuz 17 Soviet spacecraft returns to Earth.
1976 – Aeroflot Flight 3739, a Tupolev Tu-104, crashes during takeoff from Irkutsk Airport, killing 24.
1978 – The Budd Company unveils its first SPV-2000 self-propelled railcar in Philadelphia, Pennsylvania.
1982 – Japan Air Lines Flight 350 crashes near Haneda Airport in an attempted pilot mass murder-suicide, killing 24 of the 174 people on board.
1986 – Halley's Comet last appeared in the inner Solar System.
1991 – Dissolution of the Soviet Union: Voters in Lithuania vote for independence from the Soviet Union.
1996 – The Provisional Irish Republican Army declares the end to its 18-month ceasefire and explodes a large bomb in London's Canary Wharf, killing two people.
  1996   – Copernicium is discovered by Sigurd Hofmann, Victor Ninov et al.
2001 – The Ehime Maru and USS Greeneville collision takes place, killing nine of the thirty-five people on board the Japanese fishery high-school training ship Ehime Maru, leaving the USS Greeneville (SSN-772) with US $2 million in repairs, at Pearl Harbor.
2016 – Two passenger trains collide in the German town of Bad Aibling in the state of Bavaria. Twelve people die and 85 others are injured.
2018 – Winter Olympics: Opening ceremony is performed in Pyeongchang County in South Korea.
2020 – Salvadoran President Nayib Bukele has the army soldiers enter the Legislative Assembly to assist in pushing for the approval for a better government security plan, causing a brief political crisis.
2021 – Second impeachment trial of Donald Trump begins.

Births

Pre-1600
1060 – Honorius II, pope of the Catholic Church (d. 1130)
1274 – Louis of Toulouse, French bishop (d. 1297)
1313 – Maria of Portugal, Queen of Castile, Portuguese infanta (d. 1357)
1344 – Meinhard III, count of Tyrol (d. 1363)
1441 – Ali-Shir Nava'i, Turkic poet, linguist, and painter (d. 1501)
1533 – Shimazu Yoshihisa, Japanese daimyō (d. 1611)
1579 – Johannes Meursius, Dutch classical scholar (d. 1639)

1601–1900
1651 – Procopio Cutò, French entrepreneur (d. 1727)
1666 – George Hamilton, 1st Earl of Orkney, Scottish field marshal (d. 1737)
1711 – Luis Vicente de Velasco e Isla, Spanish sailor and commander (d. 1762)
1737 – Thomas Paine, English-American philosopher, author, and activist (d. 1809)
1741 – Henri-Joseph Rigel, German-French composer (d. 1799)
1748 – Sir John Duckworth, 1st Baronet, English admiral and politician, Commodore Governor of Newfoundland (d. 1817)
1763 – Louis I, Grand Duke of Baden (d. 1830)
1769 – George W. Campbell, Scottish-American lawyer and politician, 5th United States Secretary of the Treasury (d. 1848)
1773 – William Henry Harrison, American general and politician, 9th President of the United States (d. 1841)
1775 – Farkas Bolyai, Hungarian mathematician and academic (d. 1856)
1781 – Johann Baptist von Spix, German biologist and explorer (d. 1826)
1783 – Vasily Zhukovsky, Russian poet and translator (d. 1852)
1789 – Franz Xaver Gabelsberger, German engineer, invented Gabelsberger shorthand (d. 1849)
1800 – Hyrum Smith, American religious leader (d. 1844)
1814 – Samuel J. Tilden, American lawyer and politician, 28th Governor of New York (d. 1886)
1815 – Federico de Madrazo, Spanish painter (d.1894)
1834 – Felix Dahn, German lawyer, historian, and author (d. 1912)
1826 – Keʻelikōlani, Hawaiian royal and governor (d. 1883)
1837 – José Burgos, Filipino priest and revolutionary (d. 1872)
1839 – Silas Adams, American colonel, lawyer, and politician (d. 1896)
1846 – Wilhelm Maybach, German engineer and businessman, founded Maybach (d. 1929)
  1846   – Whitaker Wright, English businessman and financier (d. 1904)
1847 – Hugh Price Hughes, Welsh-English clergyman and theologian (d. 1902)
1854 – Aletta Jacobs,  Dutch physician and suffrage activist (d. 1929)
1856 – Hara Takashi, Japanese politician, 10th Prime Minister of Japan (d. 1921)
1859 – Akiyama Yoshifuru, Japanese general (d. 1930)
1863 – Anthony Hope, English author and playwright (d. 1933)
1864 – Miina Härma, Estonian organist, composer, and conductor (d. 1941)
1865 – Mrs. Patrick Campbell, English-French actress (d. 1940)
  1865   – Erich von Drygalski, German geographer and geophysicist (d. 1949)
1867 – Natsume Sōseki, Japanese author and poet (d. 1916)
1871 – Howard Taylor Ricketts, American pathologist and physician (d. 1910)
1874 – Amy Lowell, American poet, critic, and educator (d. 1925)
1876 – Arthur Edward Moore, New Zealand-Australian politician, 23rd Premier of Queensland (d. 1963)
1878 – Jack Kirwan, Irish international footballer (d. 1959)
1880 – Lipót Fejér, Hungarian mathematician and academic (d. 1959)
1883 – Jules Berry, French actor and director (d. 1951)
1885 – Alban Berg, Austrian composer and educator (d. 1935)
  1885   – Clarence H. Haring, American historian and author (d. 1960)
1889 – Larry Semon, American actor, producer, director and screenwriter (d. 1928) 
1891 – Ronald Colman, English-American actor (d. 1958)
1892 – Peggy Wood, American actress (d. 1978)
1893 – Georgios Athanasiadis-Novas, Greek lawyer and politician, 163rd Prime Minister of Greece (d. 1987)
1895 – Hermann Brill, German lawyer and politician, 8th Minister-President of Thuringia (d. 1959)
1896 – Alberto Vargas, Peruvian-American painter and illustrator (d. 1982)
1897 – Charles Kingsford Smith, Australian captain and pilot (d. 1935)
1898 – Jūkichi Yagi, Japanese poet and educator (d. 1927)

1901–present
1901 – Brian Donlevy, American actor (d. 1972)
  1901   – James Murray, American actor (d. 1936)
1905 – David Cecil, 6th Marquess of Exeter, English hurdler and politician (d. 1981)
1906 – André Kostolany, Hungarian-French economist and journalist (d. 1999)
1907 – Trường Chinh, Vietnamese politician, 4th President of Vietnam (d. 1988)
  1907   – Harold Scott MacDonald Coxeter, English-Canadian mathematician and academic (d. 2003)
1909 – Marjorie Ogilvie Anderson, Scottish historian (d. 2002)
  1909   – Heather Angel, English-American actress (d. 1986)
  1909   – Carmen Miranda, Portuguese-Brazilian actress, singer, and dancer (d. 1955)
  1909   – Dean Rusk, American colonel and politician, 54th United States Secretary of State (d. 1994)
1910 – Jacques Monod, French biochemist and geneticist, Nobel Prize laureate (d. 1976)
1911 – William Orlando Darby, American general (d. 1945)
  1911   – Esa Pakarinen, Finnish actor and musician (d. 1989)
1912 – Futabayama Sadaji, Japanese sumo wrestler, the 35th Yokozuna (d. 1968)
  1912   – Ginette Leclerc, French actress (d. 1992)
1914 – Ernest Tubb, American singer-songwriter and guitarist (d. 1984)
1916 – Tex Hughson, American baseball player (d. 1993)
1918 – Lloyd Noel Ferguson, American chemist (d. 2011)
1920 – Fred Allen, New Zealand rugby player and coach (d. 2012)
  1920   – Enrico Schiavetti, Italian football player (d. 1993)
1922 – Kathryn Grayson, American actress and soprano (d. 2010)
  1922   – Jim Laker, English international cricketer and broadcaster (d. 1986)
  1922   – C. P. Krishnan Nair, Indian businessman, founded The Leela Palaces, Hotels and Resorts (d. 2014)
  1922   – Robert E. Ogren, American zoologist (d. 2005)
1923 – Brendan Behan, Irish rebel, poet, and playwright (d. 1964)
  1923   – Tonie Nathan, American radio host, producer, and politician (d. 2014)
1925 – John B. Cobb, American philosopher and theologian
  1925   – Burkhard Heim, German physicist and academic (d. 2001)
1926 – Garret FitzGerald, Irish lawyer and politician, 7th Taoiseach of Ireland (d. 2011)
1927 – Richard A. Long, American historian and author (d. 2013)
1928 – Frank Frazetta, American painter and illustrator (d. 2010)
  1928   – Rinus Michels, Dutch footballer and coach (d. 2005)
  1928   – Roger Mudd, American journalist (d. 2021)
1929 – A. R. Antulay, Indian social worker and politician, 8th Chief Minister of Maharashtra (d. 2014)
  1929   – Clement Meadmore, Australian-American sculptor (d. 2005)
1930 – Garner Ted Armstrong, American evangelist and author (d. 2003)
1931 – Thomas Bernhard, Austrian author, poet, and playwright (d. 1989)
  1931   – Josef Masopust, Czech footballer and coach (d. 2015)
  1931   – Robert Morris, American sculptor and painter (d. 2018)
1932 – Tatsuro Hirooka, Japanese baseball player and manager
  1932   – Gerhard Richter, German painter and photographer
1935 – Lionel Fanthorpe, English-Welsh priest, journalist, and author
1936 – Callistus Ndlovu, Zimbabwean academic and politician (d. 2019)
  1936   – Clive Swift, English actor and singer-songwriter (d. 2019)
1937 – Clete Boyer, American baseball player and manager (d. 2007)
1938 – Ron Logan, Disney theatrical producer and professor
1939 – Mahala Andrews, British vertebrae palaeontologist (d. 1997)
  1939   – Barry Mann, American pianist, songwriter, and producer
  1939   – Janet Suzman, South African-British actress and director
1940 – Brian Bennett, English drummer and songwriter 
  1940   – J. M. Coetzee, South African-Australian novelist, essayist, and linguist, Nobel Prize laureate
1941 – Kermit Gosnell, American abortionist and serial killer
  1941   – Sheila Kuehl, American actress, lawyer, gay rights activist, and politician
1942 – Carole King, American singer-songwriter and pianist
1943 – Barbara Lewis, American soul/R&B singer-songwriter
  1943   – Joe Pesci, American actor
  1943   – Joseph Stiglitz, American economist and academic, Nobel Prize laureate
1944 – Derryn Hinch, New Zealand-Australian radio and television host and politician
  1944   – Alice Walker, American novelist, short story writer, and poet
1945 – Mia Farrow, American actress, activist, and former fashion model
  1945   – Yoshinori Ohsumi, Japanese cell biologist, 2016 Nobel Prize Laureate in Physiology or Medicine
  1945   – Carol Wood, American mathematician and academic
1946 – Bob Eastwood, American golfer
  1946   – Vince Papale, American football player and sportscaster
  1946   – Jim Webb, American captain and politician, 18th United States Secretary of the Navy
1947 – Carla Del Ponte, Swiss lawyer and diplomat
  1947   – Joe Ely, American singer-songwriter and guitarist
  1947   – Major Harris, American R&B singer (d. 2012) 
  1947   – Alexis Smirnoff, Canadian-American wrestler and actor (d. 2019)
1948 – Guy Standing, English economist and academic
1949 – Bernard Gallacher, Scottish golfer and journalist
  1949   – Judith Light, American actress 
1950 – Richard F. Colburn, American sergeant and politician
1951 – David Pomeranz, American singer, musician, and composer
1952 – Danny White, American football player and sportscaster
1953 – Ciarán Hinds, Irish actor
  1953   – Ezechiele Ramin, Italian missionary, priest, and martyr (d. 1985)
  1953   – Gabriel Rotello, American journalist and author, founded OutWeek
1954 – Jo Duffy, American author
  1954   – Chris Gardner, American businessman and philanthropist
  1954   – Kevin Warwick, English cybernetics scientist 
1955 – Jerry Beck, American historian and author
  1955   – Jimmy Pursey, English singer-songwriter and producer 
  1955   – Charles Shaughnessy, English actor
1956 – Mookie Wilson, American baseball player and coach
1957 – Terry McAuliffe, American businessman and politician, 72nd Governor of Virginia
  1957   – Gordon Strachan, Scottish footballer and manager
1958 – Sandy Lyle, Scottish golfer
  1958   – Chris Nilan, American ice hockey player, coach, and radio host
1960 – Holly Johnson, English singer-songwriter and bass player 
  1960   – David Simon, American journalist, author, screenwriter, and television producer
  1960   – Peggy Whitson, American biochemist and astronaut
1961 – John Kruk, American baseball player and sportscaster
1962 – Anik Bissonnette, Canadian ballerina
1963 – Brian Greene, American physicist 
  1963   – Peter Rowsthorn, Australian comedian and actor
  1963   – Travis Tritt, American singer-songwriter, guitarist, and actor
1964 – Debrah Miceli, Italian-American wrestler and manager
  1964   – Dewi Morris, English rugby player
  1964   – Alejandro Ávila, Mexican telenovela actor
  1964   – Ernesto Valverde, Spanish footballer and manager
1965 – Dieter Baumann, German runner
1966 – Harald Eia, Norwegian comedian, actor, and screenwriter
1967 – Todd Pratt, American baseball player and coach
  1967   – Dan Shulman, Canadian sportscaster
  1967   – Gaston Browne, Antiguan and Barbudan Prime Minister
1968 – Alejandra Guzmán, Mexican singer-songwriter and actress
  1968   – Derek Strong, American basketball player and race car driver
  1968   – Gloria Trevi, Mexican singer and actress
1969 – Jimmy Smith, American football player
1970 – Glenn McGrath, Australian cricketer and sportscaster
1971 – Matt Gogel, American golfer
  1971   – Johan Mjällby, Swedish footballer and manager
1972 – Darren Ferguson, Scottish footballer and manager
1973 – Svetlana Boginskaya, Belarusian gymnast
  1973   – Colin Egglesfield, American actor
  1973   – Makoto Shinkai, Japanese animator, director, and screenwriter
1974 – Jordi Cruyff, Dutch footballer and manager
  1974   – Brad Maynard, American football player
  1974   – Amber Valletta, American model 
  1974   – John Wallace, American basketball player and coach
1975 – Kurt Asle Arvesen, Norwegian cyclist and coach
  1975   – Clinton Grybas, Australian journalist and sportscaster (d. 2008)
  1975   – Vladimir Guerrero, Dominican-American baseball player
1976 – Charlie Day, American actor, producer, and screenwriter
1978 – A. J. Buckley, Irish-Canadian actor, director, and screenwriter
1979 – Akinori Iwamura, Japanese baseball player
  1979   – Irina Slutskaya, Russian figure skater
  1979   – Zhang Ziyi, Chinese actress and model
1980 – Angelos Charisteas, Greek footballer
  1980   – Margarita Levieva, Russian-American actress
  1980   – Manu Raju, American journalist
1981 – Tom Hiddleston, English actor, producer, and musical performer
  1981   – Daisuke Sekimoto, Japanese wrestler
1982 – Domingo Cisma, Spanish footballer
  1982   – Jameer Nelson, American basketball player
  1982   – Ami Suzuki, Japanese singer-songwriter and actress
  1982   – Chris Weale, English footballer and manager
1983 – Mikel Arruabarrena, Spanish footballer
1984 – Maurice Ager, American basketball player, singer, and producer
  1984   – Shōhōzan Yūya, Japanese sumo wrestler
1985 – David Gallagher, American actor 
1987 – Michael B. Jordan, American actor
  1987   – Davide Lanzafame, Italian footballer
  1987   – Magdalena Neuner, German biathlete
1989 – Maxime Dufour-Lapointe, Canadian skier
1990 – Tariq Sims, Australian-Fijian rugby league player
1992 – Kyle Feldt, Australian rugby league player
  1992   – Avan Jogia, Canadian actor
1993 – Despina Papamichail, Greek tennis player
1995 – André Burakovsky, Swedish ice hockey player
  1995   – Mario Pašalić, Croatian footballer
1996 – Chungha, South Korean singer
1997 – Saquon Barkley, American football player
  1997   – Valentini Grammatikopoulou, Greek tennis player
1998 – Cem Bölükbaşı, Turkish racing driver and former sim racer
1999 – Shonte Seale, Barbadian netball player

Deaths

Pre-1600
 966 – Ono no Michikaze, Japanese calligrapher (b. 894)
 967 – Sayf al-Dawla, emir of Aleppo (b. 916)
 978 – Luitgarde, duchess consort of Normandy
1011 – Bernard I, Duke of Saxony
1014 – Yang Yanzhao, Chinese general
1135 – Tai Zong, Chinese emperor (b. 1075)
1199 – Minamoto no Yoritomo, Japanese shōgun (b. 1147)
1251 – Matthias II, duke of Lorraine
1407 – William I, margrave of Meissen (b. 1343)
1450 – Agnès Sorel, French mistress of Charles VII of France (b. 1421)
1555 – John Hooper, English bishop and martyr (b. 1495)
  1555   – Rowland Taylor, English priest and martyr (b. 1510)
1588 – Álvaro de Bazán, 1st Marquis of Santa Cruz, Spanish admiral (b. 1526)
1600 – John Frederick, Duke of Pomerania (b. 1542)

1601–1900
1619 – Lucilio Vanini, Italian physician and philosopher (b. 1585)
1670 – Frederick III of Denmark (b. 1609)
1675 – Gerrit Dou, Dutch painter (b. 1613)
1709 – François Louis, Prince of Conti (b. 1664)
1777 – Seth Pomeroy, American general and gunsmith (b. 1706)
1803 – Jean François de Saint-Lambert, French soldier, poet, and philosopher (b. 1716)
1857 – Dionysios Solomos, Greek poet and translator (b. 1798)
1874 – Jules Michelet, French historian, philosopher, and academic (b. 1798)
1881 – Fyodor Dostoyevsky, Russian novelist, short story writer, essayist, and philosopher (b. 1821)
1891 – Johan Jongkind, Dutch painter (b. 1819)

1901–present
1903 – Charles Gavan Duffy, Irish-Australian politician, 8th Premier of Victoria (b. 1816)
1906 – Paul Laurence Dunbar, American author, poet, and playwright (b. 1872)
1928 – William Gillies, Australian politician, 21st Premier of Queensland (b. 1868)
1930 – Richard With, Norwegian captain and businessman, founded Hurtigruten (b. 1846)
1932 – Junnosuke Inoue, Japanese businessman and banker (b. 1869)
  1932   – A.K. Golam Jilani, Bangladeshi soldier and activist (b. 1904)
1942 – Lauri Kristian Relander, Finnish politician, 2nd President of Finland (b. 1883)
1945 – Ella D. Barrier, American educator (b. 1852)
1950 – Ted Theodore, Australian politician, 20th Premier of Queensland (b. 1884)
1951 – Eddy Duchin, American pianist, bandleader, and actor (b. 1910)
1957 – Miklós Horthy, Hungarian admiral and politician, Regent of Hungary (b. 1868)
1960 – Alexandre Benois, Russian painter and critic (b. 1870)
  1960   – Ernő Dohnányi, Hungarian pianist, composer, and conductor (b. 1877)
1965 – Khan Bahadur Ahsanullah, Bangladeshi theologian and educator (b. 1874)
1966 – Sophie Tucker, Russian-born American singer (b. 1884)
1969 – George "Gabby" Hayes, American actor and singer (b. 1885)
1976 – Percy Faith, Canadian composer and conductor (b. 1908)
1977 – Sergey Ilyushin, Russian engineer and businessman, founded the Ilyushin Design Company (b. 1894)
1978 – Costante Girardengo, Italian cyclist and coach (b. 1893)
1979 – Allen Tate, American poet and academic (b. 1899)
1980 – Tom Macdonald, Welsh journalist and author (b. 1900)
1981 – M. C. Chagla, Indian jurist and politician, Indian Minister of External Affairs (b. 1900)
  1981   – Bill Haley, American singer-songwriter and guitarist (b. 1925)
1984 – Yuri Andropov, Russian lawyer and politician (b. 1914)
1989 – Osamu Tezuka, Japanese illustrator, animator, and producer (b. 1928)
1994 – Howard Martin Temin, American geneticist and academic, Nobel Prize laureate (b. 1934)
1995 – J. William Fulbright, American lawyer and politician (b. 1905)
  1995   – Kalevi Keihänen, Finnish entrepreneur (b. 1924)
  1995   – David Wayne, American actor (b. 1914)
1998 – Maurice Schumann, French journalist and politician, French Minister of Foreign Affairs (b. 1911)
2001 – Herbert A. Simon, American political scientist, economist, and academic, Nobel Prize laureate (b. 1916)
2002 – Isabelle Holland, Swiss-American author (b. 1920)
  2002   – Princess Margaret, Countess of Snowdon (b. 1930)
2003 – Masatoshi Gündüz Ikeda, Japanese-Turkish mathematician and academic (b. 1926)
2004 – Claude Ryan, Canadian journalist and politician (b. 1925)
2005 – Robert Kearns, American engineer, invented the windscreen wiper (b. 1927)
2006 – Freddie Laker, English pilot and businessman, founded Laker Airways (b. 1922)
2007 – Hank Bauer, American baseball player and manager (b. 1922)
  2007   – Ian Richardson, Scottish actor (b. 1934)
2008 – Christopher Hyatt, American occultist and author (b. 1943)
  2008   – Carm Lino Spiteri, Maltese architect and politician (b. 1932)
  2008   – Jazeh Tabatabai, Iranian painter, poet, and sculptor (b. 1931)
2009 – Orlando "Cachaíto" López, Cuban bassist and composer (b. 1933)
2010 – Walter Frederick Morrison, American businessman, invented the Frisbee (b. 1920)
2011 – Miltiadis Evert, Greek lawyer and politician, 69th Mayor of Athens (b. 1939)
2012 – O. P. Dutta, Indian director, producer, and screenwriter (b. 1922)
  2012   – John Hick, English philosopher and academic (b. 1922)
  2012   – Joe Moretti, Scottish-South African guitarist and songwriter (b. 1938)
2013 – Richard Artschwager, American painter, illustrator, and sculptor (b. 1923)
  2013   – Keiko Fukuda, Japanese-American martial artist and trainer (b. 1913)
  2013   – Jimmy Smyth, Irish hurler (b. 1931)
2014 – Gabriel Axel, Danish actor, director, and producer (b. 1918)
  2014   – Hal Herring, American football player and coach (b. 1924)
  2014   – Logan Scott-Bowden, English general (b. 1920)
2015 – Liu Han, Chinese businessman and philanthropist (b. 1965)
  2015   – Ed Sabol, American film producer, co-founded NFL Films (b. 1916)
2016 – Sushil Koirala, Nepalese politician, 37th Prime Minister of Nepal (b. 1939)
  2016   – Zdravko Tolimir, Bosnian Serb military commander (b. 1948)
2017 – André Salvat, French Army colonel (b. 1920)
2018 – Reg E. Cathey, American actor of stage, film, and television (b. 1958)
  2018   – Jóhann Jóhannsson, Icelandic composer (b. 1969)
  2018   – John Gavin,  American actor and United States ambassador to Mexico (b. 1931)
2021 – Chick Corea, American jazz composer (b. 1941)
2022 – Johnny Raper, Australian rugby league player and coach (b. 1939)

Holidays and observances

Alto of Altomünster
Blessed Anne Catherine Emmerich
Ansbert of Rouen
Apollonia
Bracchio
Einion the King (Western Orthodoxy)
Blessed Leopold of Alpandeire
Maron (Maronite Church)
Miguel Febres Cordero
Nebridius
Sabinus of Canosa
Teilo (Wales)
February 9 is the earliest day on which Clean Monday can fall, while March 15 is the latest; celebrated on the first Monday of Great Lent. (Eastern Christianity)
February 9 is the earliest day on which People's Sunday can fall, while March 15 is the latest; celebrated on the first Sunday of Lent. (Malta)
St. Maroun's Day (public holiday in Lebanon)

References

Bibliography

External links

 BBC: On This Day
 
 Historical Events on February 9

Days of the year
February